The Brazilian Catholic Church, or Catholic Church in Brazil, is part of the worldwide Catholic Church, under the spiritual leadership of the Pope in Rome, and the influential National Conference of Bishops of Brazil, composed of over 400 primary and auxiliary bishops and archbishops. There are over 250 dioceses (both of the Latin and Eastern rites) and other territorial jurisdictions in Brazil. The primate of Brazil is Dom Sérgio da Rocha.

The Catholic Church is the largest denomination in the country, where 123 million people, or 64.6% of the Brazilian population, are self-declared Catholics. These figures make Brazil the single country with the largest Catholic community in the world.

History

According to the tradition, the first Mass celebrated in Brazil took place on 26 April 1500. It was celebrated by a priest who arrived in the country along with the Portuguese explorers to claim possession of the newfound land. The first diocese in Brazil was erected more than 50 years later, in 1551.

Brazil's strong Catholic heritage can be traced to the Iberian missionary zeal, with the 15th-century goal of spreading Christianity. The Church missions began to hamper the government policy of exploiting the natives. In 1782 the Jesuits were suppressed, and the government tightened its control over the Church.

Catholicism was the predominant faith during colonial rule, then in 1824 became the official religion of an independent Brazil which also guaranteed freedom of religion for its citizens. The Brazilian government has been secular since the Constitution of 1891 and the Church has remained politically influential. In the late 19th century, the Catholic population of Iberian origin was reinforced by a large number of Italian Catholics who immigrated to Brazil, as well as some Polish and German Catholic immigrants. In 1889 Brazil became a republic and approved a constitution separating the Church from the State, a trend followed by all of the country's seven republican constitutions. Prior to that, during the Empire of Brazil, Catholicism was the official religion of the country. In practice, separation of Church and state in the country is weak as government officials generally avoid taking actions that may offend the Church which represents a large majority of citizens.

A recent example of the Church's influence over political questions was the change conducted by the federal government in the Third National Program of Human Rights in regard to its proposal to legalize abortion, after pressure from the National Conference of Brazilian Bishops. That particular change, along with others, was denounced by the Amnesty International. Nevertheless, the government kept issues contrary to Church teaching in the Program, such as its support for same-sex marriage and same-sex adoption.

In the late 20th century the Church's liberation theology movement, which focuses on the poor as the primary recipients of Christ's message, helped in the quest for social justice. The church organized ecclesiastical base communities throughout the country to work for social and political causes at the local level. Despite the support of the higher clergy for the military, the progressive wing managed to make the Church practically the only legitimate focus of resistance and defense of basic human rights during military rule, as well as a main advocate for social rights and human dignity in the Constitutional Assembly of 1987–1988. When then Cardinal Ratzinger became responsible for the Congregation for the Doctrine of the Faith, he launched a successful campaign against the liberation theology, and the conservative wing of the Church gained power. Catholics then saw the rise of the Catholic Charismatic Renewal movement, as a way to counter the rapid growth of Pentecostal Protestantism in the country. According to Luis Lugo, director of the Pew Forum on Religion & Public Life, “pentecostalism no longer is something confined outside the Catholic Church, it is now firmly within the form of various charismatic tendencies and movements”.

During his five-day visit to Brazil in May 2007 Pope Benedict XVI canonized Frei Galvão, who became the first Brazilian-born saint. Both the Pope's visit and the canonisation aimed at reinvigorating the local church. Brazil was also the first foreign country visited by Benedict's successor Pope Francis.

Demographics

According to a 2007 poll conducted by the Pew Research Center's Forum on Religion & Public Life, more than 60 percent of the urban population of Brazil claims a Catholic affiliation. A 2020 poll by Datafolha suggests that the Catholic population is closer to 50 percent of the country and decreasing, with Evangelical Protestant groups growing as a proportion. Religious syncretism is widespread among Brazilian Catholics. There is an overlay of Afro-Brazilian religions (like Candomblé, Quimbanda and Umbanda) with Catholic beliefs and practices, which many Catholic Brazilians do not find inconsistent with their faith. An example is the Feast of Bonfim, a ritual in which mães-de-santo gather to wash the stairs of the Church of Nosso Senhor do Bonfim in Salvador, Bahia. Catholics are far more likely to believe in good luck charms, fortune-tellers, faith-healers and astrology than are converts to Protestantism.

Religious change in Brazil is frequent. According to polling institute Datafolha, as of July 2013, approximately 57% of those aged over 16 years old were Catholic, while evangelicals constituted 28%.

According to America Magazine in 2003, Brazilian Catholics have the highest score in the world on the image of God as a loving Father. They are also more likely to see human nature as good rather than corrupt, and the world as good rather than evil. Brazilian Catholics are less likely to believe in the literal, word-for-word interpretation of the Bible than Protestants. They are also more likely to accept premarital sex, cohabitation before marriage, homosexuality and abortion. About 40% attend Masses at least once a month—approximately the same level as that of American Catholics. Almost 75% pray every day, but only 12% engage in Church activities; only 26% say they are "very religious". More than one out of five of those who were raised Catholics leave the church, most of them taking on no religious affiliation or Protestantism. However, Catholicism has the highest rate of retention. More than two-fifths of those who were raised Protestant are no longer Protestant; the Catholic Church picks up 16% of those who were raised Protestants.

By race, 66.4% of whites are Catholic, along with 58.2% of blacks, 59.9% of East Asians, 64.1% of browns, and 50.7% of American Indians.

Catholicism by state

Catholicism by state capitals

Education
As the largest Catholic country in the world, Catholic education has a great tradition in Brazil. The Society of Jesus founded the first schools in the country, with the aim of evangelizing Native-Brazilians. In the late 18th century, Portuguese minister Marquis of Pombal attacked and expelled the Jesuits from Portugal and its overseas possessions. He seized the Jesuit schools and introduced educational reforms all over the Empire. Since then, public schools have been secular, but private Catholic schools are among the best in the country.

According to the Ministry of Education, there are more than 30 Catholic universities in Brazil. The first was the Pontifical Catholic University of Rio Grande do Sul, founded by Marist Brothers on 1931. The Pontifical Catholic University of Rio de Janeiro is the best private university in the country, and behind only the Federal University of Rio de Janeiro in the State of Rio de Janeiro. The Pontifical Catholic University of Minas Gerais had been chosen by the Ministry as the best private university, and the best in the state of Minas Gerais, the previous year. In 1969, the Pontifical Catholic University of São Paulo became the first higher education institute in Brazil to offer a post-graduation course.

Organization

In Brazil, there are a total of 275 particular churches—consisting of 44 archdioceses, 216 dioceses (2 of which are Eastern rite eparchies under Latin jurisdiction), 9 territorial prelatures, the Archeparchy of São João Batista em Curitiba and the Eparchy of Imaculada Conceição in Prudentópolis under the Ukrainian Greek Catholic Church, the Armenian Catholic Apostolic Exarchate of Latin America and Mexico, the Ordinariate for the Faithful of Eastern Rites in Brazil, the Military Ordinariate of Brazil, and the Personal Apostolic Administration of Saint John Mary Vianney.

Notable people

Pedro I of Brazil
Pedro II of Brazil
Princess Isabel
Teresa Cristina of the Two Sicilies
Machado de Assis

See also
Abortion in Brazil
2009 Brazilian girl abortion case
Brazilian Catholic Apostolic Church
Catholic Electoral League
Demographics of Brazil
History of the Catholic Church in Brazil
National Conference of Bishops of Brazil
Our Lady of Aparecida
Pan-Amazonian Ecclesial Network (REPAM)
Personal Apostolic Administration of Saint John Mary Vianney
Religion in Brazil

Lists 
 List of Brazilian Saints
 List of Catholic dioceses in Brazil

References

External links
National Conference of Brazilian Bishops
List of Catholic dioceses of Brazil
Statistics of Catholicism in Brazil

 
Brazil
Brazilian culture